The CS 42/3 is an Italian wooden cased anti-tank mine used during the Second World War. Like the earlier CS 42/2 mine it uses four PMC 43 fuzes. It is a minimum metal mine, containing no metal.

Specifications
 Dimensions: 284 x 236 x 144 millimeters
 Operating pressure: 220 lbs
 Explosive content: 11 lbs of TNT

References
 Landmine and Countermine Warfare, North Africa 1940-1943

Anti-tank mines of Italy